Mohammad Siddique Umer (born September 5, 1982) is a Pakistani sport shooter. Umer represented Pakistan at the 2008 Summer Olympics in Beijing, where he competed for two rifle shooting events. He placed forty-eighth out of fifty-one shooters in the men's 10 m air rifle, with a total score of 578 points. Nearly a week later, Umer competed for his second event, 50 m rifle 3 positions, where he was able to shoot 390 targets in a prone position, 359 in standing, and 367 in kneeling, for a total score of 1,116 points, finishing only in last place.

References

External links
NBC 2008 Olympics profile 

Pakistani male sport shooters
Living people
Olympic shooters of Pakistan
Shooters at the 2008 Summer Olympics
1982 births
Shooters at the 2006 Asian Games
Shooters at the 2014 Asian Games
Asian Games competitors for Pakistan